Swon may refer to:

 The Swon Brothers, Colton and Zach Swon, singers
 SWON, video game